Kampong Anggerek Desa is a village in Brunei-Muara District, Brunei, as well as a neighbourhood in the capital Bandar Seri Begawan. The population was 1,443 in 2016. It is one of the villages within Mukim Berakas 'A'. The postcode is BB3713.

Facilities 
Anggerek Desa Primary School is the village primary school. It also shares grounds with Anggerek Desa Religious School, the village school for the country's Islamic religious primary education.

References 

Neighbourhoods in Bandar Seri Begawan
Villages in Brunei-Muara District